Saleem Badar (born 16 May 1953) is a former Pakistani cricket umpire. He stood in five Test matches between 1988 and 1998 and 29 ODI games between 1988 and 2002. He also stood in the final of the 2007–08 Quaid-e-Azam Trophy.

See also
 List of Test cricket umpires
 List of One Day International cricket umpires

References

1953 births
Living people
People from Karachi
Pakistani Test cricket umpires
Pakistani One Day International cricket umpires